Sanwar is a village under new formed district of Charkhi Dadri in Haryana, India.

Demographics 

 
As of 2001 India census, population of Sanwar is 7674.

Villages in Charkhi Dadri district